Michael Kümmerle (born 21 April 1979) is a German former professional footballer who played as a defender.

Career
Kümmerle was born in Leonberg. He spent six seasons on the professional league level in the 2. Bundesliga with Stuttgarter Kickers and Greuther Fürth.

References

1979 births
Living people
German footballers
Association football defenders
Germany under-21 international footballers
Stuttgarter Kickers players
SpVgg Greuther Fürth players
TSG 1899 Hoffenheim players
Kickers Emden players
KSV Hessen Kassel players
Atromitos Yeroskipou players
2. Bundesliga players
Cypriot First Division players
German expatriate footballers
German expatriate sportspeople in Cyprus
Expatriate footballers in Cyprus
People from Leonberg
Sportspeople from Stuttgart (region)
Footballers from Baden-Württemberg